Polyporus is a genus of poroid fungi in the family Polyporaceae.

Taxonomy
Italian botanist Pier Antonio Micheli introduced the genus in 1729 to include 14 species featuring fruit bodies with centrally-placed stipes, and pores on the underside of the cap.

Elias Fries divided Polyporus into three subgenera in his 1855 work Novae Symbol Mycologici: Eupolyporus, Fomes, and Poria. In a 1995 monograph, Maria Núñez and Leif Ryvarden grouped 32 Polyporus species into 6 morphologically-based infrageneric groups: Admirabilis, Dendropolyporus, Favolus, Polyporellus, Melanopus, and Polyporus sensu stricto.

The identity of the type species of Polyporus has long been a matter of contention among mycologists. Some have preferred P. brumalis, some P. squamosus, while others have preferred P. tuberaster.

Several molecular phylogenetics studies have shown that Polyporus, as currently circumscribed, is polyphyletic and will need to have its generic limits revised.  Some species such as P. squamosus and P. varius have been moved to genus Cerioporus.

Species

 Polyporus alveolaris
 Polyporus alveolarius  
 Polyporus arcularius
 Polyporus brumalis
 Polyporus choseniae
 Polyporus corylinus  
 Polyporus craterellus
 Polyporus cryptopus
 Polyporus dictyopus  
 Polyporus gayanus  
 Polyporus grammocephalus  
 Polyporus guianensis
 Polyporus hapalopus – China
 Polyporus ianthinus
 Polyporus lepideus  
 Polyporus leprieurii 
 Polyporus longiporus  
 Polyporus melanopus
 Polyporus meridionalis
 Polyporus minutosquamosus – French Guiana
 Polyporus mikawai  
 Polyporus phyllostachydis, Sotome, T. Hatt. & Kakish.
 Polyporus pinsitus  
 Polyporus pseudobetulinus  
 Polyporus radicatus
 Polyporus rhizophilus
 Polyporus septosporus
 Polyporus squamulosus  
 Polyporus subvarius  
 Polyporus tenuiculus  
 Polyporus tessellatus
 Polyporus thailandensis Sotome (2016) – Thailand
 Polyporus tricholoma 
 Polyporus tuberaster, tuberous polypore (type species)
 Polyporus tubiformis  
 Polyporus udus  
 Polyporus umbellatus
 Polyporus varius = Cerioporus varius
 Polyporus virgatus

References

External links
  at Molecular Phylogeny

 
Polyporales genera
Bioluminescent fungi
Fungi described in 1763
Taxa named by Michel Adanson

de:Stielporlinge#Systematik